Ravindra Kushawaha is an Indian politician and is the seventeenth Lok Sabha Member of Parliament. In the 2019 elections, he was elected from the Salempur seat of Uttar Pradesh.

References

Living people
India MPs 2014–2019
Lok Sabha members from Uttar Pradesh
People from Ballia district
Place of birth missing (living people)
Bharatiya Janata Party politicians from Uttar Pradesh
1962 births
India MPs 2019–present

External links
Ravindra Kushwaha